House of Nobles can refer to:

 House of Nobles (Hawaii), a political institution in the Kingdom of Hawaii, part of the Legislature of the Hawaiian Kingdom
 House of Nobles, an alternate name for the House of Knights, a corporation of the Swedish nobility